Ibn Taimiya School and College is a kindergarten through twelfth grade school in the Tomsom Bridge area of Comilla, Bangladesh. It was established in 1979. Several times in recent years it has placed among the top ten schools in the region in terms of student performance. It is an educational institution that teaches students moral, social and interactive skills. 

EIIN Number : 105751

History
Ibn Taimiya began in 1979 as a kindergarten. Later it was expanded to cover secondary education through grade 10, and in 1996 a college section (grades 11–12) was added.

Students take their Secondary School Certificate (SSC) and Higher Secondary (School) Certificate (HSC) examinations under the Board of Intermediate and Secondary Education, Comilla. Ibn Taimiya School and College placed among the top ten schools under this board in terms of SSC results in 2013, 2014, 2015,2018,2019 and 2020.

See also
 Education in Bangladesh
 List of universities and schools in Comilla
 List of Educational Institutions in Comilla

References

External links
 

Schools in Comilla District
1979 establishments in Bangladesh
Educational institutions established in 1979